Lloyd Johnson may refer to:
Lloyd Johnson (fashion retailer) (born 1945), English fashion entrepreneur
Lloyd Johnson (baseball) (1910–1980), Major League Baseball pitcher
Lloyd Johnson (bobsleigh), American bobsledder
Lloyd Johnson (footballer) (1913–2004), Australian footballer
Lloyd Emmett Johnson (born 1945), Canadian politician

See also
Tebbs Lloyd Johnson (1900–1984), British speedwalker
Lloyd (disambiguation)
Johnson (disambiguation)